Hedeoma reverchonii, commonly called Reverchon's false pennyroyal, is a species of flowering plant in the mint family (Lamiaceae). It is native to the south central region of the United States, where it is primarily found in Texas, extending into small areas of Arkansas and Oklahoma. Its natural habitat is on open, calcareous rock outcrops.

Hedeoma reverchonii is a robust perennial with a woody base. It produces white or lavender colored flowers in the summer. The crushed plant has an odor of camphor or lemon. This trait helps distinguish Hedeoma reverchonii from the similar-looking Hedeoma drummondii, which is a smaller plant with an aroma of peppermint.

Taxonomy
There are two recognized varieties. They are:
Hedeoma reverchonii var. reverchonii - More widespread; plants lemon-scented, with larger flowers.
Hedeoma reverchonii var. serpyllifolium - Restricted to the southern portion of the species's range; plants camphor-scented, with smaller flowers.

References

reverchonii
Flora of Texas
Flora of Arkansas
Flora of Oklahoma
Flora without expected TNC conservation status